Guillaume Dustan (November 28, 1965, Paris – October 3, 2005) was an openly gay French writer. Dustan's 1998 novel, In My Room, brought the author instant notoriety for his masterful use of autofiction and depiction of gay glamour and romance in mid-1990s Paris.

Early life and education
Dustan was born William Baranès in France in 1965. He graduated from the École nationale d'administration and worked as an administrative judge before turning to writing. He used the pen name Guillaume Dustan from 1995 onwards.

Work 
Dustan's first novel, Dans ma chambre (In My Room), brought him immense fame in France for his ambitious portrayal of gay life in a Paris celebrated for its sensual pleasures and haunted by the AIDS crisis. He also edited Le Rayon Gay, a collection of books, for Balland.

He was also a short film producer and he films he has produced include Nous and Back.

In 2004, Dustan played a role in the film Process written & directed by C. S. Leigh. He was the employee who checks Béatrice Dalle into the hotel where she later takes her own life. The film also stars Guillaume Depardieu.

Dustan's writing has been compared to Renaud Camus, Marguerite Duras, Hervé Guibert, Celine's Journey to the End of the Night, Eugene O'Neill's Long Day's Journey into Night, and Bret Easton Ellis. Critic Bruce Hainley writes that Dustan celebrated Duras for her liberating sense of abjection and "alcoholizations of the first person," including her “bad French, her badly written books of the ’eighties and ’nineties.”

Dustan's first three novels, In My Room, I'm Going Out Tonight, and Stronger Than Me, published in France between 1996 and 1998, were re-released in English by Semiotext(e) in 2021. Edited by Thomas Clerc and translated by Daniel Maroun, the novels follow the narrator's sexual journeys Paris

He is a contemporary to gay writers like Herve Guibert, Dennis Cooper, Kevin Killian, and Gary Indiana. Dustan was a proponent of barebacking and at loggerheads with ACT UP.

Death 
Dustan died of an accidental drug overdose on October 3, 2005. He is buried in Montparnasse Cemetery (division 29).

Bibliography
 Dans ma chambre, (tr. In My Room, Serpent's Tail and Semiotext(e)), 1996
 Je sors ce soir, 1997
 Plus fort que moi, 1997
 Nicolas Pages, 1999 (winner of the Prix de Flore)
 Génie divin, 2001
 LXIR, 2002
 Dernier Roman, 2004
 Premier Essai, 2005

Reedition 
 Oeuvres 1, 2013
Includes Dans ma chambre, Je sors ce soir and Plus fort que moi (all three commented by Thomas Clerc)
English: The Works of Guillaume Dustan, Volume 1, tr. Daniel Maroun, forthcoming May 2021

Further reading
 Lagabriell, Renaud, '»Je vis dans un monde où plein de choses que je pensais impossibles sont possibles«: »Queere Bedeutungen« in Dans ma chambre von Guillaume Dustan,' in Anna Babka und Susanne Hochreiter (Hg.), Queer Reading in den Philologien: Modelle und Anwendungen (Göttingen, Vandenhoeck & Ruprecht, 2009), 221–236.
 Raffaël Enault, Dustan Superstar. Biographie, Paris, Robert Laffont, 2018.

References

External links 
 

1965 births
2005 deaths
École nationale d'administration alumni
20th-century French novelists
21st-century French novelists
French gay writers
French LGBT novelists
French LGBT rights activists
Writers from Paris
French male essayists
French male novelists
20th-century French male writers
21st-century French male writers
20th-century French essayists
20th-century French LGBT people
21st-century French LGBT people